Derrick Bragg is a Canadian politician, who was elected to the Newfoundland and Labrador House of Assembly in the 2015 provincial election. He represents the electoral district of Fogo Island-Cape Freels as a member of the Liberal Party.

He was re-elected in the 2019 provincial election. On September 13, 2019, he was appointed Minister of Municipal Affairs and Environment in the Ball government.

On August 19, 2020, he was appointed Minister of Transportation and Infrastructure, and Minister Responsible for the Public Procurement Agency in the Furey government. He was re-elected in the 2021 provincial election. On April 8, 2021, he was appointed Minister of Fisheries, Forestry and Agriculture.

References

Living people
Liberal Party of Newfoundland and Labrador MHAs
Members of the Executive Council of Newfoundland and Labrador
21st-century Canadian politicians
Year of birth missing (living people)